Alan Hale Jr. (born Alan Hale MacKahan; (March 8, 1921 - January 2, 1990) was an American actor and restaurateur. He was the son of actor Alan Hale Sr. His television career spanned four decades, but he was best known for his secondary lead role as Captain Jonas Grumby, better known as The Skipper, on the 1960s CBS comedy series Gilligan's Island (1964–1967), a role he reprised in three Gilligan's Island television films and two spin-off cartoon series.

Hale appeared in more than 200 films and television roles from 1941. He appeared primarily in Westerns, portraying the Sundance Kid in The Three Outlaws (1956) opposite Neville Brand as Butch Cassidy, performing with Kirk Douglas in The Big Trees (1952), Audie Murphy in Destry (1954), Ray Milland in A Man Alone (1955), Robert Wagner in The True Story of Jesse James (1957), and Hugh Marlowe in The Long Rope (1961). He also appeared in musical comedies opposite Don DeFore in It Happened on Fifth Avenue (1947), James Cagney in The West Point Story (1950), and Judy Canova in Honeychile (1951). He also appeared on several talk and variety shows.

Early life
Alan Hale MacKahan was born in Los Angeles, California. His father was character actor Rufus Edward MacKahan, who used the stage name of Alan Hale, and his mother was silent film actress Gretchen Hartman. His father appeared in more than 235 films and had a successful screen career, both as a leading man in silent films and as a supporting actor in sound movies. Hale Jr. was in the silent movies as a baby.

Hale served in the United States Coast Guard during World War II. He dropped the "Junior" from his name after his father died in 1950.

Career

In 1931, Hale made his Broadway stage debut in Caught Wet. The play opened on November 4 and closed later that month. He made his screen debut in Wild Boys of the Road which was released in 1933. Although his role was deleted from that film's final release, he still received screen credit for his performance. He later appeared in roles in To the Shores of Tripoli (1942), Yanks Ahoy (1943), Sweetheart of Sigma Chi (1946), and When Willie Comes Marching Home (1950). During the late 1940s and early 1950s, he frequently appeared in Gene Autry films and also had a recurring role from 1950 to 1952 on The Gene Autry Show.

By the early 1950s, Hale began to work in television. In 1952, he landed the starring role in CBS's Biff Baker, U.S.A.. The series was canceled in 1954. He continued his career on the small screen by appearing in guest spots on a variety of other series, such as The Range Rider (five times), Annie Oakley, Fireside Theater, Frontier, Matinee Theater, Fury, Northwest Passage, and The Man from Blackhawk.

The year 1957 proved to be an especially busy one for Hale on television series. In addition to performing the role of Shawnee Bill on the Western Wanted Dead or Alive, he played a folksy rancher, Les Bridgeman, in "Hired Gun", an episode of the ABC/Warner Brothers series Cheyenne. Later that year Hale landed another starring role in the syndicated television series Casey Jones, which lasted for thirty-two half-hour episodes before its cancellation in 1958. Then, from 1958 to 1960, he was cast in a recurring role on Rory Calhoun's CBS Western The Texan. Hale also returned to the series Cheyenne in 1960 to portray the character Tuk in the episode "Road to Three Graves".

Throughout the early 1960s, Hale continued in guest-starring roles on episodes of Gunsmoke, Bonanza, Rawhide, The Real McCoys, Mister Ed, Green Acres, Assignment: Underwater, Hawaiian Eye, Adventures in Paradise, Lock Up, The Andy Griffith Show, Lassie, Tales of Wells Fargo, Route 66 and Hazel. He was featured in two episodes of Perry Mason, first as murderer Lon Snyder in the 1961 episode "The Case of the Unwelcome Bride", and then in 1963 as Nelson Barclift in "The Case of the Bouncing Boomerang".

Despite his growing commitment to roles on television, Hale throughout the 1950s and into 1960s continued his work in supporting roles in feature films. Some of those include The Gunfighter (1950) with Gregory Peck, At Sword's Point (1952) with Cornel Wilde and Maureen O'Hara, The Man Behind the Gun (1953) with Randolph Scott, Silver Lode (1954) with John Payne and Dan Duryea, The Sea Chase (1955) with John Wayne and Lana Turner, The Three Outlaws (1956) with Neville Brand as Butch Cassidy and Hale as the Sundance Kid, The True Story of Jesse James (1957) with Robert Wagner as Jesse James and Jeffrey Hunter as Frank James, Up Periscope (1959) with James Garner and Edmond O'Brien, Thunder in Carolina with Rory Calhoun (1960), The Long Rope with Hugh Marlowe (1961), Bullet for a Badman (1964) with Audie Murphy and Darren McGavin, Advance to the Rear (1964) with Glenn Ford and Stella Stevens, and Hang 'Em High (1968) with Clint Eastwood.

Gilligan's Island

In 1964, Hale won the co-starring role as the Skipper on the CBS sitcom Gilligan's Island. The series aired for a total of 98 episodes from 1964 to 1967. His character proved to be the most prominent role of Hale's career, as the show continued in reruns. The popularity of the show typecast its actors, making it difficult for them to successfully pursue different roles. Hale did not mind being so closely identified with the Skipper. According to Sherwood Schwartz, he often visited children in hospitals dressed as the Skipper.

Hale reprised the role of the Skipper in three television films, Rescue from Gilligan's Island (1978), The Castaways on Gilligan's Island (1979), and The Harlem Globetrotters on Gilligan's Island (1981). He also voiced the Skipper in two cartoon versions of the series, The New Adventures of Gilligan from 1974 to 1977 and Gilligan's Planet from 1982 to 1983. Hale also appeared as the Skipper in two unrelated sitcoms, The New Gidget and ALF in 1987. Hale also played a Skipper look-a-like taxi cab driver named J. Grumby on Growing Pains. He also promoted Gilligan's Island reruns on TBS, alongside Bob Denver. Denver and Hale also appeared as their characters at various promotional events.

Dawn Wells said in a 2014 interview on CRN.com with Larry and Nancy Manetti, when asked if Alan Hale Jr. was the consummate professional of the Gilligan's Island series: "Well, that is so interesting, because Alan Jr. and his father looked so much alike, you don't know, who was who. His father did all the Errol Flynn ... I used to say to Alan, 'How was it growing up in a household, with all those movie stars?' Alan was absolutely, the consummate professional, wonderful gentleman, jovial, never complained ... he was the exact same size of my dad. Every time he picked me up and hugged me, I thought he was my father, he was my dad." Wells also responded to the question if she ever went to her acting mentor's restaurant (that Hale once owned in Los Angeles): "It was a lobster house on La Cienega Blvd., and he would greet you with his sea hat on, as you can.... but that was after the show; and he had his friend, Anthony, there, with some good food, too." The last question asked of Dawn was if Gilligan's Island, was nearly his (Hale's) show: "No, no... as a matter of fact, it was interesting when you go back and find the people that they thought should play the other characters, and I understand Alan was doing a movie in Utah and they wanted to bring him to audition and he couldn't get a flight out, so ... he hitchhiked, hitchhiked on the highway and then, he came in to audition." After the show's cancellation, and until Hale's death, Wells not only stayed in touch with him but they were also frequently neighbors. After Hale's mother Gretchen died in 1979 the friendship between Hale and Wells grew closer.

Later years
After the end of Gilligan's Island, Hale continued his career in television. He guest-starred on several more series, including The Wild Wild West, Here Come the Brides, Land of the Giants, The Virginian, Here's Lucy, Marcus Welby, M.D., The Paul Lynde Show, The Love Boat and Crazy Like a Fox.

Hale performed as well in additional feature films during the 1970s and the 1980s. He starred in The Giant Spider Invasion (1975) and Angels Revenge (1978). In 1983, Hale co-starred in comedy-drama film Hambone and Hillie, starring Lillian Gish. The following year, he had a role in the comedy Johnny Dangerously and became a spokesman for a car dealership in Victoria, British Columbia. In 1987, Hale starred in the horror film Terror Night. Later that same year, he made his final film appearance in a cameo role with Bob Denver in Back to the Beach. Also in 1987, he reprised his role as the Skipper on The New Gidget with his childhood friend and classmate William Schallert and Bob Denver, and on an episode of ALF.

Other ventures
In addition to acting, Hale co-owned Alan Hale's Lobster Barrel, a restaurant he opened in the mid-1970s. The Lobster Barrel was located on La Cienega Boulevard on Los Angeles's Restaurant Row. According to Hale's agent, Hale was "phased out" of the business in 1982. He later opened Alan Hale's Quality and Leisure Travel office.

Personal life
Hale was married twice; his first marriage was on March 12, 1943 in Hollywood to Bettina Reed Doerr, with whom he had four children: Alan Brian, Chris, Lana, and Dorian. The couple later divorced. In 1964, Hale married former singer Naomi Grace Ingram, to whom he remained married until his death.

Death
Hale died on January 2, 1990, of thymus cancer at St. Vincent Medical Center in Los Angeles at age 68.  His body was cremated, and his ashes were sprinkled into the Pacific Ocean. His Gilligan's Island co-star Dawn Wells was in attendance, representing the surviving members of the cast.

For his contribution to the television industry, Alan Hale Jr. has a star on the Hollywood Walk of Fame located at 6653 Hollywood Boulevard.

Stage career

Selected filmography

References

External links

 
 
 
 
 
 Hale and his father

1990 deaths
20th-century American businesspeople
20th-century American male actors
American male film actors
American male stage actors
American male television actors
American restaurateurs
California Democrats
Deaths from cancer in California
Male actors from Los Angeles
Male Western (genre) film actors
United States Coast Guard enlisted
United States Coast Guard personnel of World War II